Eduardo Casanova (born 24 March 1991) is a Spanish actor and filmmaker, popularly known in Spain for his role as Fidel in the sitcom Aída (2005–2014).

Biography 

He was born in Madrid on 24 March 1991.

In 2005, age 14, he joined the cast of Aída, aired on Telecinco and which was a spin-off of 7 vidas. Casanova played the role of Fidel, an openly gay teenager (described as the "first gay boy in Spanish TV"), earning him great popularity in Spain. After ten seasons, Aída ended in 2014 and Casanova then advanced his interest on film direction, while also starring in a number of productions.
In 2017, after directing short films, Casanova presented his debut feature film: Skins.

In 2022, he participated in Drag Race España'''s Season 2 as a guest judge.

His sophomore feature, Piety'', premiered in 2022.

Filmography

Actor 
Television

Film

Director

References 

1991 births
Spanish film directors
Spanish male television actors
Spanish male film actors
21st-century Spanish male actors
Male actors from Madrid
Living people